KUGN (590 AM) is a commercial radio station, owned by Cumulus Media and broadcasting a news/talk format. Licensed to the city of Eugene, Oregon, it serves the Eugene-Springfield media market.  KUGN partners with local CBS television affiliate KVAL Channel 13 for breaking news and weather coverage.  National news is supplied by CBS News Radio.

KUGN broadcasts with 5000 watts, around the clock.  By day, the signal is non-directional.   But at night, KUGN uses a directional antenna to protect other stations on 590 kHz.  The transmitter is located in Eugene off North Game Farm Road and KUGN's studios and offices are on Executive Parkway.

Listeners in the Springfield area can also receive KUGN programming on 98.1 MHz over K251CY, an FM translator.

Programming 
On weekdays, KUGN carries nationally syndicated radio shows.  The day begins with America in The Morning followed by Armstrong & Getty based at KSTE in Sacramento.  Other hosts on KUGN include Chris Plante, Ben Shapiro, Mark Levin, John Batchelor, Sean Hannity, and Doug Stephan.

Weekends feature shows on investing, money, home repair and law.  Syndicated weekend programming includes computer expert Kim Komando and Bill Handel on law.  Some weekday shows are repeated and some weekend hours are paid brokered programming.

Sports
KUGN is the flagship radio station of the Oregon Sports Network, and broadcasts University of Oregon football and basketball games, which are simulcast on co-owned sports radio station KUJZ 95.3 FM.

History
KUGN first signed on the air on July 4, 1946, as the second radio station in Eugene, after KORE. KUGN was originally affiliated with the ABC radio network, but switched to NBC in December 1952. The station dropped the longtime NBC affiliation for CBS in December 1977.  In 1953, KUGN raised its power to 5,000 watts, to become the most powerful radio station in Oregon, outside the Portland metropolitan area.  In 1979, KUGN began airing some Mutual Broadcasting System programming, including Monday Night Football and Larry King's popular late night talk show.

During its first four decades, KUGN was best known for its eclectic, personable announcers. The careers of such veterans as Duke Young, Dick Cross, Dave Miller, Russ Doran, Skip Hathaway, Webb Russell, Wendy Ray and Dale "Uncle Fuzzy" Reed spanned the period from the late 1950s to the early 1970s.  The station had the first traffic reports in the market in 1976 when Ken Strobeck did morning and afternoon drive-time reports in the "KUGN Traffic Rabbit," a Volkswagen Rabbit equipped with a radio telephone and portable transmitter. Tom Lichty ("Major Tom") took over the job in late 1976 when traffic reporting took flight, serving both as traffic reporter and pilot.

The "old" KUGN, which Ray called "the best radio station in the world," is remembered for its popular "Morning Show." Reed teamed with Ray and news director Fred Webb for a popular program that was a "must hear" in the Eugene area throughout the 1970s, 1980s, and early 1990s.  "The Morning Show" entertained listeners with such lighthearted features such as Ray's "Ball Score Boogie," the "Poet's Nook" starring Webb as the high-buttoned poetry devotee "Charles," Lichty's traffic reports, and "Gridpute," a tongue-in-cheek Friday morning football preview featuring Ray and a clanking, cantankerous "computer."  Ray and Webb also teamed up on the morning newscasts, twice hourly between 5:30 and 10 a.m. D.J.-anchor "Uncle Fuzzy" knit it all together with his wry commentary and savvy music choices (adult contemporary music with a fair amount of jazz).

Ray retired from radio in March 1992.  Reed and Webb continued until that November, but management chose not to renew their contracts.  The station experimented with a few replacements, before settling on a morning news team of Ralph Steadman and Rick Little.  Steadman exited in 1995 to make way for University of Oregon sportscaster Jerry Allen.   Then in 2016, KUGN began carrying Armstrong & Getty, based at KSTE in Sacramento.

Ownership
KUGN-AM was founded in 1946 by C.H. Fisher of Portland.  After some years, his children - Carl Fisher, Jane Whitbread, and Nancy Harrison - assumed daily operations of the station.  In 1972 Obie Advertising bought KUGN from the Fishers.  Obie was headed by Brian Obie, a future mayor of Eugene.  Obie Advertising sold KUGN to Dallas-based Media Corp. of America in 1987.  Then in mid-1989, long-time employees Jim Torrey (also a future mayor of Eugene) and Chuck Chackel purchased KUGN for $4.2 million.  The new company was called Combined Communications.  Torrey sold his interest in the company in 1991.

In 1996, the Federal Communications Commission changed radio station ownership rules to allow companies to own up to six stations in a market (see Telecommunications Act of 1996).  Prior to 1996, companies could only own two FM and two AM stations per market.  Combined Communications took advantage of the new ownership rules and sold the station in 1996 to Deschutes Broadcasting for $7 million.  Over the next three years, the station passed hands from Deschutes to Citadel Broadcasting to Marathon Media, and finally, to Cumulus Broadcasting.  Cumulus also purchased five other stations in the Eugene area.

"Home of the Ducks"
In 1959, KUGN became the first flagship station of the newly-created University of Oregon sports radio network, with play-by-play announcer John Tasnady starting a three-season run as the football "Voice of the Ducks." Previously, KUGN was one of four Eugene stations to carry Oregon and Oregon State football games on the Tidewater Associated Oil Co. network.

KUGN news- and sportscaster Wendy Ray, already a veteran sportscaster, took the microphone in 1960 as the Ducks' basketball announcer, when KUGN got the broadcast rights to that sport from local rival KASH.  When Tasnady retired from broadcasting prior to the 1962 football season, Ray stepped in as football announcer, and called both sports up through the 1969 Oregon-Oregon State "Civil War" football game. Color commentator Mike Guldager stepped in as play-by-play announcer for the season finale at Hawaii, and then announced Ducks basketball and football until 1973.

Ray returned to Oregon Ducks play-by-play for one season (1974–75) as football and basketball announcer. He also served as color commentator for new play-by-play announcer Warren Swain in the 1980 football season. Outside radio, Ray was the longtime public address announcer for Oregon track and field meets at Hayward Field.  Other KUGN "voices" of University of Oregon sports were Bud Sobel (1973–74), Ralph Petti (football, 1975), Mike Stone (1975–80), Swain (1980–82), Portland sportscaster Bill Johnson (1982–84) and Hal Ramey (1984–87).

KUGN lost the broadcast rights to Duck sports in 1987, when the University of Oregon athletic department set up its own in-house radio network. The university put the network's flagship status up for bidding, and local rival KPNW won out over KUGN.  During that time, KUGN became the flagship station for the Oregon State Beavers football radio network, outbidding Portland station KEX-AM.  Eight years later, KUGN regained the broadcast rights to Duck sports. Play-by-play announcer Jerry Allen moved from KPNW to KUGN at that time.  Today Ducks' broadcasts are shared with co-owned sports radio station KUJZ 95.3 FM.

References

External links
FCC History Cards for KUGN
KUGN official website

UGN
News and talk radio stations in the United States
Radio stations established in 1946
1946 establishments in Oregon
Cumulus Media radio stations